Thiago Ribeiro dos Santos (born 28 March 1989), born Thiaguinho, is a Brazilian footballer.

Biography
Thiaguinho (little Thiago) left for Croatian side Hajduk Split along with Rafael Paraíba in 2009. He then transferred to Caxias do Sul on a one-year contract.

References

External links
CBF Registry 
 Profile

1989 births
Living people
Brazilian footballers
Expatriate footballers in Croatia
Brazilian expatriate footballers
Grêmio Foot-Ball Porto Alegrense players
HNK Hajduk Split players
Association football defenders
People from Aracaju
Sportspeople from Sergipe